Artist Love is a 1935 German historical drama film directed by Fritz Wendhausen and starring , Wolfgang Liebeneiner and Olga Chekhova.

The film's sets were designed by the art director Werner Schlichting.

Synopsis
In 1887 in Munich, a rising artist paints a portrait of a dancer. The success of it during an exhibition leads to him being awarded a major commission in Rome, and he begins to move in high society. By the time he returns home he has almost forgotten about her.

Cast
 as Toni
Wolfgang Liebeneiner as Peter
Olga Chekhova as Olivia Vanderhagen
Hans Brausewetter as Stupps
Harald Paulsen as Count Hohenstein
Genia Nikolaieva as Mizzi
Ilse Fürstenberg as Frau Heller
Otto Sauter-Sarto as Herr Sedlmair
Josefine Dora as Frau Sedlmair
Paul Mederow as Professor Bergland
F. W. Schröder-Schrom as Prince regent
Klaus Pohl as ballet master
Albert von Kersten as von Reedern
Kurt Keller-Nebri as Intendant
Paul Rehkopf as Artist love
Valeska Stock as Frau Memminger
Alfred Stein as Beamter im Glaspalast
Max Tobien as Beamter im Glaspalast
Nino Poli as Italian dealer
Erika Nymgau-Odemar as Italian landlady
Hanns Waschatko as packer
Peter Frank-Höfer as Peter's friend
Hans Bernuth as Peter's friend
Heinrich Thomas as Peter's friend
Eberhard Schott as Peter's friend

References

External links

Films directed by Fritz Wendhausen
Films of Nazi Germany
Terra Film films
1930s historical drama films
German historical drama films
Films set in the 1880s
Films set in Munich
Films set in Rome
Films about fictional painters
German black-and-white films
1935 drama films
1930s German films
1930s German-language films